The 2018 DStv Mzansi Viewers' Choice Awards were held on 24 November 2018, at Sandton Convention Center in Johannesburg.

Performances

Winners and Nominees

Favourite Personality Of The Year
Bonang Matheba
 Papa Penny
 Nomzamo Mbatha
 Somizi Mhlongo
 Kagiso Rabada

Favourite Song Of The Year
Prince Kaybee (featuring, Zanda Zakuza, TNS and The Soulmates) - "Club Controller"
 Heavy K (featuring Busi and Nokwazi) - "Inde"
 DJ Maphorisa (featuring Busiswa, DJ Tira and Moonchild Sanelly - "Midnight Starring"
 Distruction Boyz (featuring Dlala Mshunqisi, Benny Maverick and DJ Tira) - "Omunye"
 Kwesta (featuring Wale) - "Spirit"

Favourite TV Presenter
Pearl Modiadie
 Lerato Kganyago
 Thomas Mlambo
 Carol Shabalala
 Anele Mdoda

Favourite Comedian
Skhumba
 Felixs Hlope
Tumi Morake
 Smokey Nyembe
 Mpho "Pops"

Favourite Rising Star
Distruction Boyz
 Smash Africa
 Luvo Manyonga
 Lungi Ngidi
 Langa Mavuso

Favourite Radio Personality
Ntate Thuso Motaung
 Anele Mdoda
 Lady Dee Khoza
 DJ Fresh
 Selby Selbeyonce

Favourite Actor
Warren Masemola

 Hamilton Dlamini
 Mduduzi Mabaso
 Masoja Msiza
 Khulu Skenjana

Favourite Actress
Thembsie Matu
 Rami Chuene
 Linda Sebezo
 Moshidi Motsega
 Lesego Marakala

Favourite Music Artist/Group
Khuzani
 Lady Zamar
 Shekinah
 Distruction Boyz
 AKA

Favourite DJ
Black Coffee
 Ms Cosmo
 DJ Maphorisa
 DJ Tira
 Prince Kaybee

Favourite Sports Personality
Caster Semenya
 Kagiso Rabada
 Percy Tau
 Pitso Mosimane
 Siya Kolisi

Ultimate Viewers' Choice
Thembsie Matu

1Life Life Changer Award
Moses Lehlokoa

1Life Legend Award
Rebecca Malope

References

South African television awards
South African music awards
2018 awards
2018 in South African television